Annie Barrows (born 1962 in San Diego, California) is an American editor and author. She is best known for the Ivy and Bean series of children's books, but she has written several other books for adult readers as well. She co-wrote 'The Guernsey Literary And Potato Peel Pie Society' with her aunt Mary Ann Shaffer, which was later adapted into a film.

Personal life
Barrows was the second of two girls (her sister is two years older). She was born in San Diego, near the southern border of the state of California. However, when she was three weeks old the family moved to a small town, San Anselmo, in Northern California. She spent considerable time during her childhood in the town's children's library, where she eventually got a part-time job (during her junior high school years) maintaining the books and reshelving them.

Barrows attended UC Berkeley, originally majoring in English Literature, but graduating in Medieval History. She worked as an editor, then decided to turn to writing. She enrolled in a writing school, then began writing books for adults.

Barrows is married. She has two daughters. Her aunt was Mary Ann Shaffer.

Writing career
Barrows' first writing output was for adult non-fiction. In 2003 she turned to Children's literature, for which she is most noted and honored. Of her interest in this area she has written:
I sometimes think I've spent my entire life trying to recreate one particular afternoon of my tenth year. That was the day I lay on the couch reading a wonderful book called Time at the Top until I lost all sense of my real life and joined the life of the book instead. It was glorious, like walking into a dream. I want every kid to have that experience, but most of all, being horribly selfish, I want to have it again, too. And finally, I've discovered a way: I write books.

Published works
The Magic Half (2009)
The Ivy & Bean series (2003-2018; 12 books published as of April 2021)
The Guernsey Literary and Potato Peel Pie Society (2008; Barrows is listed as co-author, after she finished the book for her aunt, Mary Ann Shaffer, who fell ill and died before the book was ready for publication)
Magic in the Mix (2014) (sequel to The Magic Half)
The Truth According to Us (2015)
Nothing (2017)

Awards and recognitions
Kentucky Bluegrass Award nominee (2011)
Mark Twain Readers Award nominee (2010–11)
Virginia Readers' Choice nominee (2010–11)
Rhode Island Children's Book Award nominee (2011)
Massachusetts Children's Book Award nominee (2011)
Sasquatch Reading Award nominee (2011)
Maud Hart Lovelace Award nominee (2011–12)
Sunshine State Young Readers Award nominee (2011–12)

References

Living people
1962 births
Writers from California
American children's writers